The Flat Landing Brook Formation is a geological formation in
Gloucester County of northern New Brunswick, Canada. It consists mostly of volcanic rocks that were deposited 466 to 465 million years ago during the Darriwilian stage of the Middle Ordovician epoch.

Lithology
Rhyolite flows, breccias and hyaloclastics are the primary rocks comprising the Flat Landing Brook Formation. Locally abundant rocks include tholeiitic to transitional mafic fragmental rocks and massive flows, as well as felsic tuffs, tholeiitic pillow basalts and minor porphyritic felsic flows. Siltstone, greywacke, iron formation, ferromanganiferous shale and chert represent minor rocks.

Stratigraphy

Relationship to other units
The Flat Landing Brook Formation is the middle member of the Tetagouche Group. Exposures between Route 490 and the headwaters of Flat Landing Brook are the type locality. It is conformably overlain by massive pillowed alkali basalt of the Little River Formation and conformably underlain by crystal tuff as well as quartz-feldspar augen schist of the Nepisiguit Falls Formation. The contact of the Flat Landing Brook and Little River formations is exposed in the Brunswick Mines area and near California Lake whereas the contact of the Flat Landing Brook and Nepisiguit Falls formations is exposed along The Narrows of the Nepisiguit River.

Subdivisions
Four named subdivisions comprise the Flat Landing Brook Formation:

Volcanology
It may also represent the largest supervolcanic eruption of the Paleozoic era. Most of the volcanic rocks were laid down during a timespan of possibly less than two million years. The only rocks that do not seem to be related to the caldera are scattered dikes and small effusive flows of the Taylor Brook rhyolites, the latter of which probably issued from parasitic vents on the outer margins of the caldera.

See also
List of volcanoes in Canada
Volcanism of Eastern Canada

References

Geologic formations of New Brunswick
Calderas of New Brunswick
Supervolcanoes
Ordovician calderas
Tuff formations